The 2010–11 Toto Cup Leumit was the twenty-nine season of the third most important football tournament in Israel since its introduction and seventh under the current format. It held in two stages. First, sixteen Liga Leumit teams were divided into four groups. The winners and runners-up advanced to the Quarterfinals. Quarterfinals, Semifinals and Finals were held as one-legged matches, with the Final played at the Ramat Gan Stadium.

The defending champions were Ironi Kiryat Shmona, making it their second Toto Cup title overall, due to the promotion in the last season the club could not defend their title.

It won on 15 December 2010 by Ironi Ramat HaSharon.

Group stage
The draw took place on June 14, 2010.

The matches were played from 7 August to 28 October 2010.

Group A

Group B

Group C

Group D

Elimination rounds

Quarterfinals
The matches were played on 9 November 2010.

1 Score after 90 minutes

Semifinals
The matches were played on 30 November 2010.

1 Score after 90 minutes

Final

See also
 2010–11 Toto Cup Al
 2010–11 Liga Leumit
 2010–11 Israel State Cup

External links
 Official website 

Leumit
Toto Cup Leumit
Toto Cup Leumit